Seraa Ala El Remal (also known as "Conflict on the Sand") is a Syrian Arab soap opera/telenovela first aired on Dubai TV during Ramadan 2008. It was written by Palestinian writer Hani Saadi, directed by Hatem Ali, and produced by Dubai Media.

Description
Seraa Ala El Remal chronicles the lives of around Arab Bedouin in the desert during the early eighteenth century, weaving the fates of different people gathered by love and dispersed by the war, with stories of love and horsemanship, loyalty, betrayal and revenge.

The most expensive Arabic TV series ever, the estimated cost to produce Seraa Ala El Remal was $6 million. It was filmed from October 2007 through February 2008 in Dubai, Morocco and  Syria, with sites including Palmyra in Syria and Ouarzazate in Morocco.

Cast
From Syria:
Muna Wassef
Taim Hasan
Abdul Munim al-Ameri
Abdel Rahman Abu Kassim
Bassel Khayyat
Rana Abyad
Safa Sultan
Joseph Nashef
Vilda Sammour
Khalid Al Qeesh
Rana Jammoul
Luma Ibrahim
Jaber Joukdar
Adham Murshed
Muhannad Qatish
Mohammad Al Rashi
Hassan Oweiti
Seif Eddin Subaie
Zinati Qudsiya

From Jordan:
Saba Mubarak
Nadia Odeh
Nidal Najem
Anahid Fayad

From Morocco:
 Mohamed Meftah

References

Syrian television soap operas
2008 Syrian television series debuts